The Payen Pa.101 was an experimental aircraft designed by Nicolas Roland Payen in the 1930s.

Design
The Pa.101 was quite unorthodox for employing a combination of a delta wing and canard surfaces, given that the delta wing was in its developmental infancy.

Specifications

References

Bibliography
 

Pa.101
1930s French experimental aircraft
Single-engined tractor aircraft
Canard aircraft
Delta-wing aircraft
Mid-wing aircraft